Dixie Dugan is a 1943 American comedy film, directed by Otto Brower. It stars Lois Andrews, James Ellison, and Charlotte Greenwood. Intended as the first of a series, the film was not a success and the plans for sequels were scrapped.

Cast
 Lois Andrews as Dixie Dugan
 James Ellison as Roger Hudson
 Charlotte Greenwood as Mrs. Dugan
 Charles Ruggles as Pa Dugan
 Helene Reynolds as Jean Patterson
 Raymond Walburn as J.J. Lawson
 Ann E. Todd as Inogene Dugan
 Eddie Foy Jr. as Matt Hogan
 Irving Bacon as Mr. Kelly
 Sarah Edwards as Mrs. Kelly
 George Melford as Mr. Sloan
 Mae Marsh as Mrs. Sloan
 Morris Ankrum as Editor
 George Lessey as Sen. Patterson

See also
Show Girl (1928)
Showgirl in Hollywood (1930)

References

External links
Dixie Dugan at the Internet Movie Database

1943 films
1943 comedy films
20th Century Fox films
American comedy films
Films based on American comics
Films based on comic strips
Films directed by Otto Brower
Films scored by Emil Newman
Live-action films based on comics
American black-and-white films
Films scored by Arthur Lange
1940s American films